Dodson High School may refer to:

Dodson High School (Louisiana) in Dodson, Louisiana
Dodson High School (Montana) in Dodson, Montana